James Adam (7 April 1860 – 30 August 1907) was a Scottish classicist who taught Classics at Emmanuel College, Cambridge.

Life
He was born on 7 April 1860 in Kinmuck in the parish of Keithhall near Inverurie, Aberdeenshire. He was educated at the Old Grammar School in Old Aberdeen, at the University of Aberdeen where he studied under William Geddes and  gained his B.A. as Senior Classic in 1884, and at Emmanuel College, Cambridge where he graduated as M.A. in 1888. 

In 1884 Adam was appointed Junior Fellow and soon thereafter Senior Lecturer in the Classics at Emmanuel College. 

In 1890, a former student of his, Adela Marion (née Kensington) (1866–1944), became his wife and lifelong collaborator. Their daughter, Barbara Frances (1897–1988), was the British sociologist and criminologist Lady Barbara Wootton; one of their sons, Captain Arthur Innes Adam, was killed in France on 16 September 1916; and another son, Neil Kensington Adam, became a noted chemist.

Adam was "one of the greatest Platonists of his generation". His editions and commentaries on Plato's Apology, Crito, Euthyphro, Protagoras, and the Republic are widely respected even today:

[His] two-volume critical edition of the Republic was another major contribution to the field. Though his preface claims 'an editor cannot pretend to have exhausted its significance by means of a commentary,' Adam's depth of knowledge and erudite analysis of the Greek text ensured that his edition remained the standard reference for decades to follow, and it remains a thought-provoking evaluation of one of the great works of Western thought.

He was a "strong defender of the importance of Greek philosophy in a well-rounded education" and "a resolute opponent of all attempts to make Greek an optional study". He was also a "keen supporter of the claims of women to degrees, when the question came before the senate of the university in 1897"

In 1904 and 1905 Adam delivered the Gifford Lectures at Aberdeen, choosing for his subject "The Religious Teachers of Greece".

He died in Aberdeen on 30 August 1907.

Editions and commentaries on Plato
Platonis Apologia Socratis.  Cambridge University Press, 1887. New edition, 1891.
Platonis Crito.  Cambridge University Press, 1888.  2nd edition, 1893.
Platonis Euthyphro.  Cambridge University Press, 1890.
Platonis Protagoras.  Cambridge University Press, 1893 with Adela Marion Adam.
 The Republic of Plato.  Cambridge University Press, 1897.   2nd edition edited by D. A. Rees, 1965.

Other writings
The Nuptial Number of Plato: its Solution and Significance.  1891.
The Intellectual and Ethical Value of Classical Education. Cambridge, 1895.
The Religious Teachers of Greece: Being Gifford Lectures on Natural Religion Delivered at Aberdeen. Edinburgh: T. and T. Clark, 1908. Edited, with a memoir, by Adela Marion Adam from the Gifford Lectures delivered in 1904-06.  
The Vitality of Platonism, and Other Essays.  Edited and published by A.M. Adam in 1911.

References

External links

 Gifford Lecture Series - Authors, includes short bio and a link to view Adam's Religious Teachers of Greece.
 J. Adam & A.M. Adam's Commentary on the Protagoras at Perseus
 Adam's Commentary on the Republic at Perseus
The Republic of Plato, edited with critical notes and introduction on the text by James Adam., Cambridge: University Press, 1900 (reprint of the first edition of 1899).

Scottish classical scholars
Alumni of the University of Aberdeen
Fellows of Emmanuel College, Cambridge
1860 births
1907 deaths
Alumni of Gonville and Caius College, Cambridge
20th-century Scottish writers
People from Inverurie